Saptaswaralu or Sapta Swaralu is a 1969 Telugu-language film directed by Vedantam Raghavayya and produced by famous actor Tadepalli Lakshmi Kanta Rao under the banner Hema Films.

It is a musical hit film with excellent lyrics with music composed by T. V. Raju.

Plot
Devi Saraswathi gave Saraswati Peetham to a Gandharva and advises him to go some good to Bhoolokam. Shetfuygytpft\lls in Mandakini river. Both the Gandharva and his lover are cursed to be born on Earth. Gandharva and the villain are in search of Sharada peetam. Finally the Gandharva procures the peetham and gives to an eligible old musician to care of it and utilize for good.

Cast
 Tadepalli Lakshmi Kanta Rao as Saranga
 Rajasree as Jayanthi
 Vijayalalitha as Devamanohari
 V. Nagayya as Vidyanandudu
 Kaikala Satyanarayana as Abheri
 Vijayanirmala as  Saraswati
 Rama Krishna as  Narada
Dhulipala
Rajababu
Balakrishna

Soundtrack
There are 14 songs and poems. The lyrics are written by C. Narayana Reddy and Veeturi. Music score provided by T. V. Raju.
 "Ade Neevantivi Ade Nevintini Gunde Alalaga Chelarega'' (Lyrics: C. Narayana Reddy; Singers: Ghantasala and P. Susheela; Cast: Kanta Rao and Rajasri)
 "Om Namo Vedantavedyala Meghasyamala" (Venkateswara Suprabhatam)
 "Kasturi Tilakam Lalataphalake Vakshasthale Kaustubham" (Srikrishna Karnamrutam) (Singer: Ghantasala; Cast: Kanta Rao)
 "Krishnayya Gadasari Krishnayya Gopemma Sogasari Gopemma" (Lyrics: C. Narayana Reddy; Singers: Ghantasala and P. Susheela; Cast: Kanta Rao and Rajasri)
 "Cham Cham Chammacekka Saisaisai Chakkani Chukka" (Singer: Vijayalakshmi Kannarao group)
 "Jaya Jaya Maharudra" (Dandakam) (Singers: A.V.S. Murthy group)
 "Dendamu Dochina Nandakishorudu Endu Daageno" ((Lyrics: C. Narayana Reddy; Singers: Ghantasala)
 "Nadame Vedasaram Ananda" ((Lyrics: C. Narayana Reddy; Singers: A.V.S. Murthy, S. Janaki and Ghantasala; Cast: Kanta Rao)
 "Ninuganna Kanulu Swami Neevunna Taavule Brundavanulu" (Singer: P. Susheela)
 "Yakumbendu Tusharahara Dhavala Ya Subhavastra" (Slokam) (Singer: P. B. Srinivas)
 "Yadubala Sritajapala Darisanameevaya Gopala" (Lyrics: Veeturi; Singers: Ghantasala group)
 "Saranga Toluta Nee Ramaneeya Rupame Kannaanu" (Poem) (Singer: P. Susheela)
 "Saa Sakala Dharmalalo SarvatamOttamadedi" (Poems) (Singers: Vijayalakshmi Kannarao and Ghantasala)
 "Hayiga Padana Geetam Jagamulu Pogadaga Jejelu" (Lyrics: Veeturi; Singers: P. B. Srinivas and Ghantasala)

References

External links
 Saptaswaralu at IMDb.
 Listen to Sapta Swaralu songs at Music India Online.com

1969 films
1960s Telugu-language films
Hindu mythological films
Films scored by T. V. Raju
Films directed by Vedantam Raghavayya